David Prater is the current Oklahoma County, District 7, District Attorney.

Career 
Prater served 16 years as district attorney, planning to retire in 2023. In 2022, Mark Myles is running for his seat. 

In 2014, Prater, along with former-DA Tim Harris, claimed the Oklahoma Pardon and Parole Board was "biased and mismanaged." In 2010, both Prater and Harris ran opposed in Oklahoma. In 2008, both Harris and Prater were two of sixteen DAs that "came to the Capital to drive home the point that a budget shortfall would cripple crime fighting efforts statewide."

In July 2020, Prater had protestors arrested outside his office. 

In September 2021, David Prater blamed Hollywood and George Soros in a news conference for how the board voted to commute the sentence of Julius Jones. Also in 2021, activists including the NAACP sought a grand jury to investigate Prater, complaining "he has illegally violated high-profile death row inmate Julius Jones' constitutional rights because of race." Also, they alleged "he has filed frivolous legal actions and made public statements intended to intimidate the Oklahoma Pardon and Parole Board from giving Jones a fair hearing." This came after Prater requested a grand jury to investigate the Pardon and Parole Board alongside the Oklahoma County Jail. The petition for a grand jury against Prater was also for his "choice to press terrorism charges against the most active people who were involved in the May 30, 2020, Black Lives Matter – George Floyd protest" which became a "permanent tipping point for some. It has been a lasting source of bewilderment and anger against Prater since." 

Prater filed a motion "to remove Kelly Doyle and Andrew Luck from the clemency hearing for Julius Jones." Prater alleged "the two are biased because of their work with inmates on criminal justice reform." Attorneys for Luck, Doyle and the board  "filed motions to dismiss the request, arguing that it is moot because of the court’s prior rejection of the claims."  This was the second time he had tried to get Luck and Doyle removed from the board, but the supreme "court rejected it."  Prater criticized Doyle and Luck  "for their professional connections to organizations that assist people leaving prison." Adam Luck later resigned in 2022 at the request of Governor Stitt and Edward Konieczny was appointed. When Prater filed his request, "Attorney General John O’Connor, who Governor Kevin Stitt appointed...filed an identical request. He asked the Court to remove Doyle and Luck on the same day DA Prater’s request was denied." Prater called for an investigation "because inmates have been released from prison by mistake" against Governor Kevin Stitt's criticism who called it "the latest political stunt to intimidate the Pardon and Parole Board and obstruct the Constitutional process as high-profile cases that his office prosecuted are being considered."

Prater accused Doyle and Luck in his first  motion of "having a financial interest in commuting sentences because both are employed by nonprofit organizations that work with people newly released from prison." In the Tulsa World, the DAs were are said to be taking an increasingly more political role that has "to some degree weakened" the board's influence. District Attorneys like Prater and Steve Kunzweiler have criticized the Oklahoma Pardon and Parole Board, who want the board to be more conservative in their considerations for parole and commutation, despite the Republican Governor Kevin Stitt having expressed full confidence. Dark money conservative attack ads from Conservative Voice of America  targeting Stitt as not tough enough on crime started airing in 2021. 

In 2021, David Prater was accused of witness tampering, a felony, yet he undertook "an investigation of himself through his own capacity as the District Attorney." A judge denied the motion to disqualify him, but had the witness "been allowed to testify, it would have put Prater and his assistant district attorneys in the awkward position of disputing testimony from a witness who is typically called by prosecutors." 

In March 2022, Kelly Doyle resigned, possibly due to the harassment   of "identical back-to-back lawsuits filed by both Oklahoma County District Attorney David Prater and Attorney General John O'Connor where they "attempted to remove specific [OK pardon and parole board] members who voted in favor of Julius Jones." Doyle had requested the costs and attorney's fees associated be covered in response. Kelly Doyle's attorney said that AG O'Connor "knew his application to the Supreme Court was both 'untimely' and 'frivolous', and used the same arguments that Oklahoma County District Attorney David Prater used in a Supreme Court hearing that was held 7 days prior." 

Also in 2022, Prater was given the investigation into Epic Charter Schools after originally overseeing it.

Grand Jury 
Findings in a May 2022 grand jury report filed by David Prater criticized Governor Kevin Stitt for being grossly improper and that he pressured the Oklahoma Pardon and Parole Board. His private meetings seem to have violated the Open Meetings Act.  District Attorneys have the ability to bring grand juries. David Prater was accused of using the "investigative body to continue working a case that he had begun in front of the state’s multi-county grand jury earlier in 2021. Rep. Terry O’Donnell (R-Catoosa) and his wife, Teresa, were indicted Dec. 17 on a combined seven criminal counts related to his authorship of a bill that legalized her ability to become a state-appointed tag agent in Catoosa." The "investigation into the Pardon and Parole Board began in October," but Prater "was the second prosecutor to be involved in the matter." That Thursday evening when the report came out, Stitt’s office issued a statement saying, "'This is the latest in a string of unfounded hit jobs by the Oklahoma County District Attorney and other political insiders.'" Charlie Hannema, a spokesman for Stitt, said that “Oklahoma law explicitly prohibits grand juries from making allegations that public officials have engaged in misconduct, and it is clear the outgoing prosecutor took advantage of the citizens who served on this grand jury to unwittingly carry out his partisan feud against Governor Stitt and the Pardon and Parole Board.” The report noted that the jury "had no legal authority to accuse the governor of official misconduct, which can only be done in impeachment proceedings." Later, Stitt "asked a judge to strike from a grand jury report a finding that he placed 'improper political pressure' on his appointees to the Oklahoma Pardon and Parole Board."

See also 
 List of district attorneys by county
 Oklahoma Pardon and Parole Board

References 

21st-century American lawyers
Living people
Year of birth missing (living people)
District attorneys in Oklahoma